LUMS or lums may refer to:
Lahore University of Management Sciences
London Universities Mooting Shield
Lancaster University Management School
Lum's - A defunct U.S. family restaurant chain
Plural of lum
Lums: The Game of Light and Shadows - A video game by Hyperbolic Magnetism